David C. Zuidmulder (February 4, 1906 – June 8, 1978) was an American football player.

Biography
David Zuidmulder was born on February 4, 1906, in New Franken, Wisconsin. After playing football and baseball, he was appointed head of the Green Bay fire department in 1955 after having served on the force since 1934. He died on June 8, 1978.

Athletics career
Zuidmulder was a star football player for East Green Bay High School. He played at the collegiate level at Georgetown University and St. Ambrose University. After this he became a tailback in the National Football League for the Green Bay Packers from 1929 to 1931. Zuidmulder was also a semi-professional baseball player for the Green Bay Green Sox, and he was an athletics coach at Central Catholic High School in Green Bay from 1944 to 1945.

See also
Green Bay Packers players

References

External links

1906 births
1978 deaths
People from Brown County, Wisconsin
Players of American football from Wisconsin
American football halfbacks
Georgetown Hoyas football players
St. Ambrose Fighting Bees football players
Green Bay Packers players
Green Bay East High School alumni